HMS BYMS-2203 (J 1003) was a  originally built for the United States Navy during World War II. Upon completion she was transferred to the Royal Navy under Lend-Lease. She was returned to the U.S. Navy after conclusion of the war, and struck soon after. She was never commissioned in the U.S. Navy.

She was laid down 15 January 1942 as YMS-203 by the Hiltebrant Dry Dock Co. of Kingston, New York. She was launched on 15 January 1943 and delivered 31 August 1943 and transferred to the Royal Navy as BYMS-2203.

Little is known of her war record. She sailed from the United Kingdom to Malta as a part of Convoy KMS 43 on 11 December 1943, and, at least for a time, she served in the Pacific.

She was returned to U.S. custody on 12 November 1946 and struck from the Naval Vessel Register, 13 December 1946. Her final fate is unknown.

References

External links 
 

YMS-1-class minesweepers of the United States Navy
Ships built in Kingston, New York
1943 ships
World War II minesweepers of the United States
BYMS-class minesweepers
World War II minesweepers of the United Kingdom